Jack Barnes may refer to:

 Jack Barnes (born 1940), American Communist and the National Secretary of the Socialist Workers Party
 Jack Barnes (association footballer) (1908–2008), English association footballer
 Jack Barnes (Australian footballer) (1905–1999), Australian rules footballer
 Jack Barnes (rugby league), rugby league footballer of the 1950s and 1960s
 Jack Barnes (toxinologist) (1922–1985), Australian toxinologist

See also
 Jock Barnes (1907–2000), New Zealand trade unionist
John Barnes (disambiguation)